"It Started with a Kiss" is a 1982 song by Hot Chocolate, from their seventh studio album Mystery. It reached number 5 in the UK, making it their fifth-highest-charting single.

Track listings

1982 release
 7" single (wordwide) / 12" single (DE)

1993 re-release
 UK 7" single / cassette

 UK CD maxi-single (Part 1)

 UK CD maxi-single (Part 2)

1998 re-release (Hot Chocolate featuring Errol Brown)
 UK CD maxi-single / cassette

Album appearances 

The song was re-released as a single in 1993 and 1998.

Charts

Original 1982 release

Re-releases

Certifications

References

External links 
 Page On Discogs
 Video On YouTube

1982 songs
1982 singles
Hot Chocolate (band) songs
Songs written by Errol Brown
RAK Records singles
Songs about kissing